A sticker is a type of  label: a piece of printed paper, plastic, vinyl, or other material with temporary or permanent pressure sensitive adhesive on one side. It can be used for decoration or for functional purposes, depending on the situation.

Stickers can come in many different shapes and sizes and also vary widely in color and design. They are often adhered to items such as lunchboxes, paper, lockers, notebooks, walls, cars, windows, used as name tags, and so on.  

The term "sticker price" refers to the historic practice of adhering a large sticker to the window of a new car listing its base price, options, shipping charges, etc. (from which a discount was often negotiated).

History 

 
R. Stanton Avery is credited with creating the first self-adhesive sticker in 1935.

Use 

Stickers are very widely used when an object requires identification with a word or idea. Brand stickers may be attached to products to label these products as coming from a certain company. They may also be used to describe characteristics of the products that would not be obvious from simple examination, or to clarify either a printing error or change in the product of some kind, such as the country of origination, shift in a product's ingredients, a shelf life date, or copyright notice, without having to scrap pre-existing packaging for such a small change. A label dispenser is often used as a convenient way to separate the sticky label from its liner or backing tape.

Stickers placed on automobile bumpers, magnetic and permanent, called bumper stickers, are often used by individuals as a way of demonstrating support for political or ideological causes. Identification of vehicle registration and last service details are two examples of stickers on the inside of most car windscreens. The term "window sticker" is generally used for vinyl labels which are stuck to the inside of a vehicle's window, as opposed to water-resistant stickers that are stuck to the outside of a vehicle but can be affixed to anything.

Stickers are also used for embellishing scrapbooking pages. Kinds of stickers sold for this purpose include acrylic, 3D, cardstock, epoxy, fabric, flocked, sparkly, paper, puffy, and vellum. While in the earlier days of scrapbooking stickers were sold mostly on 2"x6" sheets, now 6"x12" and even 12"x12" size sheets are very common.

They are frequently distributed as part of promotional, and political campaigns; for example, in many voting districts in the U.S., stickers indicating an individual has voted are given to each voter as they leave the polling place, largely as a reminder to others to vote.  Observers may clap hands, honk a horn or otherwise applaud a good sticker.

In the 16th century French aristocracy wore stickers on their face to hide blemishes.

Temporary stickers are used today to indicate whether someone is free of certain health symptoms, been vaccinated, or otherwise cleared some security protocol.

Stickers are also used as a form of guerilla marketing, as well as serving as a ubiquitous form of visual and physical vandalism.

Stickers are also printed to use it as a temporary tattoos.

Collecting 

At their simplest stickers can be beginner-friendly collectables, serving as a gateway to the collecting hobby.

Forming a partnership with FIFA in 1970, Panini first produced a World Cup sticker album for the 1970 World Cup. Initiating a craze for collecting and trading stickers, since then, collecting and trading stickers has become part of the World Cup experience, especially for the younger generation. UK newspaper The Guardian states, “the tradition of swapping duplicate [World Cup] stickers was a playground fixture during the 1970s and 1980s.”

See also
 Beauty mark
 Decal
 Pressure-sensitive tape
 Prizes
 Release liner
 Sticker album
 Sticker (Internet) – emoticon-like pictures
 Water slide decal
 Tattoo

References

External links

 
Stationery